Thin Line Fest, often abbreviated as TL Fest, is an annual city-wide festival of film and music organized jointly that takes place during the spring in Denton, Texas, United States. The film portion of the festival is the longest running documentary film festival in Texas. The film sessions and music shows are spread across different venues across the city throughout the duration of the event. The Fest also hosts film award ceremonies. The festival includes a combination of local and international creators.

Due to the COVID-19 pandemic, the festival took place exclusively online in both 2020 and 2021.

In 2022, the festival ran from March 23rd through the 27th, included over 50 film and short screenings, and over 50 live music performances at seven different venues.

See also 
 Denton Arts and Jazz Festival
 35 Denton

References

External links 
 Official Website
 Coverage at North Texas Daily

Annual events in Texas
Music festivals in Texas
Film festivals in Texas
Festivals in Texas
Festivals in Denton, Texas
Denton, Texas